UFC on Fuel TV: Franklin vs. Le (also known as UFC on Fuel TV 6) was a mixed martial arts event held by the Ultimate Fighting Championship on November 10, 2012, at the Macau, SAR, China.
It was the first UFC event held in China.

Background
As a result of the cancellation of UFC 151, bouts between Takeya Mizugaki vs. Jeff Hougland and John Lineker vs. Yasuhiro Urushitani were rescheduled for this event.

Marcelo Guimarães was expected to face Hyun Gyu Lim at the event; however, Guimarães was forced out of the bout with an injury and replaced by David Mitchell. Lim was then pulled from the bout by doctors and the fight was subsequently cancelled.

Kyung Ho Kang was expected to face Alex Caceres at this event; however, Kang was forced out of the bout with an injury and was replaced by promotional newcomer Motonobu Tezuka.

Results

Bonus awards
Fighters were awarded $40,000 bonuses.
Fight of the Night: Takanori Gomi vs.  Mac Danzig
Knockout of the Night: Cung Le
Submission of the Night: Thiago Silva

See also
List of UFC events
2012 in UFC

References

External links
Official UFC past events page
UFC events results at Sherdog.com

UFC on Fuel TV
2012 in mixed martial arts
Mixed martial arts in Macau
2012 in Macau sport